L'Avventura, meaning The Adventure in Italian, is the debut studio album by Dean & Britta, released in 2003 and originally credited to "Britta Phillips & Dean Wareham." It was produced by Tony Visconti (Bowie, T. Rex).

Track listing

"Night Nurse" - 3:53
"Ginger Snaps" - 4:01 	
"I Deserve It" (Madonna) - 4:19	
"Out Walking" 	- 3:32
"Moonshot" (Buffy Sainte-Marie) - 4:33
"Hear the Wind Blow" (Opal) - 3:11	
"Your Baby" - 4:19	
"I Threw It Away" (Angel Corpus Christi) - 4:29	
"Knives from Bavaria" - 4:00	
"Random Rules" (Silver Jews) - 4:13	
"Indian Summer" (The Doors) - 3:41

References

2003 debut albums
Dean & Britta albums
Albums produced by Tony Visconti